John Petre, 1st Baron Petre (20 December 1549 – 11 October 1613) was an English peer who lived during the Tudor period and early Stuart period. He and his family were recusants — people who adhered to the Roman Catholic faith after the English Reformation. Nevertheless, Lord Petre was appointed to a number of official positions in the county of Essex.

Biography

John was the only surviving son of the statesman Sir William Petre by his second wife Anne Browne, daughter of Sir William Browne, Lord Mayor of London. He lived at Ingatestone Hall in Essex.

A talented amateur musician, he kept a full set of musical instruments (lute, five viols, virginals and organ) and was a patron of the composer William Byrd, a fellow Roman Catholic who lived at nearby Stondon Massey. On several occasions, Byrd brought a group of musicians to Ingatestone to entertain at Christmas and dedicated a collection of his Graduale settings to Lord Petre. John Petre was not endowed with the ability of his father and a much less forceful character but being a diligent landowner, public figure and a competent musician along with his great possessions and his father's fame served him well. We know little more about him. Like his descendants, he was a Roman Catholic, but he must have kept his religious opinions in the background, or James would hardly have made him a peer.

In 1570, he married Mary (died 2 August 1604), eldest daughter of Sir Edward Walgrave (or Waldegrave) of Borley. By the time of her marriage, Mary was fatherless and poor but gave her parents-in-law 'much joy in his choice'. She left four sons, of whom the eldest, William (1575-1637), 2nd Lord Petre, was the father of William Petre (1602–1677). He probably erected the beautiful recumbent tomb of Sir William, and is himself commemorated by the magnificent one in the north chapel, now the vestry.

When Sir William died in 1572, his widow continued to reside at Ingatestone Hall, and so John and Mary, then resident at Writtle Park, looked for another property to suit their status. In 1574, John added West Thorndon Hall and a further  to the family estate, which became the principal seat of the family.

He was knighted, in 1576, by Queen Elizabeth I after his father's death. The domestic papers of Queen Elizabeth's time not infrequently notice Sir John. Despite his Catholic attitudes, he held a number of local offices in Essex, as JP, sheriff (1575-6), and deputy lieutenant (1590–98). He was also MP for Essex in the Parliaments of 1584–85 and 1586-87. 

In 1603, he was raised to the peerage as Baron Petre, of Writtle in the County of Essex. He publicly acknowledged that he was a Roman Catholic and his descendants remained Catholic since.

In 1589, his father's friend, William Cecil, now Lord Burghley, wrote to the Deputy Lieutenants of Essex that he has appointed three gentlemen to be captains of the '600 foot formerly entrusted to Sir J. Petre.' 

The year 1590 found these foot soldiers trained and in readiness, but the Deputy Lieutenants reported to Lord Burghley that the horses were not ready; they had provided sufficient powder, and assured him that the observances of Lent had in all things been confirmed. This was just after the Spanish Armada, and the county still lived in fear of invasion. The same year found John Petre joined with Sir Thomas Mildmay in investigating the grievance of the mariners, gunners, fishermen, and other seafaring men within the county, who complained they were kept from their ordinary occupation by being constrained to attend at three hours’ warning for Navy service.

In 1600, Sir John installed his newly married son in Ingatestone Hall, to gain experience in the ‘government’ of a house, and the in-going inventory gives a vivid picture of it within a generation of the builder's death.

On his accession to the English throne, King James I found himself short of money, and, his predecessors having disposed of all the Abbey and Church lands, he ingeniously started selling peerages. Eight years later James created baronetcies, and sold them instead of the peerages. By 1615, James was selling peerages at £100,000 each, just over £11 million today).

John Petre's vast properties and position in the county would have justified James I elevating him to the peerage which he was in the accession honours on 21 July 1603 and thus created Baron Petre of Writtle. But we can be reasonably sure that John's ennoblement was for more honourable reasons, as J.P., High Sheriff, Deputy Lieutenant, Knight of the Shire and militia commander, he was a loyal servant of the Crown.

He died at West Horndon, Essex on 11 October 1613, and was buried in St Edmund and St Mary's Church, Ingatestone, leaving three sons and one daughter. He augmented his father's benefactions to Exeter College, contributed £951 to the Virginia Company, and became a Roman Catholic. Exeter College published in his honour a thin quarto entitled 'Threni Exoniensium in obitum … D. Johannis Petrei, Baronis de Writtle', Oxford, 1613. He was succeeded in the barony by his son William.

Memorials
A pair of paintings among the Petre Pictures dating from 1590, attributed to Marcus Gheeraerts, were once thought to be the portraits of John and Mary. The paintings were restored after the fire at Thorndon Hall in 1876 and brought to Ingatestone Hall, and bear painted inscriptions naming the subjects. Art historian Roy Strong contends that these are in fact portraits of John's son and daughter-in-law, William Petre and Katherine, daughter of the Earl of Worcester. The portraits are colourful and relaxed, showing fashionable changes in costume. Lord Petre wears a white ruff over a lace collar, embroidered doublet, full breeches, bobbed hair, moustache and slight beard and, in the fashion of the time, the minute patch of hair below the bottom lip. His wife is equally in fashion; the cartwheel-topped skirt, the full upper sleeves and a variation of ruff open in front to show the neck, a delicate silver tiara and the splendid necklace of pearls, 1466 in all.

The stone tomb of Lord Petre and Mary is situated in the Ingatestone Church.

Notes

References 
Edwards, A. C.,  John Petre: Essays on the life and background of John, 1st Lord Petre, 1549-1613. London and New York: Regency Press, 1975.
P. W. Hasler, P. W. (ed.), The History of Parliament: The House of Commons 1558-1603 (London, 1981), III, 209-10.
Kidd, Charles & Williamson, David (eds.) Debrett's Peerage and Baronetage (1990 edition). New York: St Martin's Press, 1990, 

1549 births
1613 deaths
Lord-Lieutenants of Essex
16th-century English nobility
17th-century English nobility
John
High Sheriffs of Essex
English MPs 1584–1585
English MPs 1586–1587
1